Beverley Jean Morrison, better known as Beaver (28 December 1950, in Lower Hutt – 23 May 2010, in Auckland), was a New Zealand  jazz singer. She was an occasional actress  who appeared in small roles in television and film.
She was a long running member of the ground-breaking Blerta musical and theatrical co-operative, and later of the similar troupe Red Mole. She played a small role in the 1985 movie Should I be Good, a New Zealand film based on the Mr. Asia drug ring, and performed the theme song to the TVNZ soap opera Gloss (1987–1990).

Awards
Her 1988 album Live at Ronnie Scott's was voted New Zealand's "Best Jazz Album" that year.

Personal life 
She had two daughters with fellow New Zealand-born actor Bill Stalker.

She died of sarcoma at the age of 59 in Auckland.

References

External links
 Her entry at Bruce Sergent's New Zealand Music site
 John Dix, Beaver profile at audiocultre.co.nz

1950 births
2010 deaths
Deaths from cancer in New Zealand
20th-century New Zealand women singers